Doug Belgrad is an American film and television producer. He was previously an executive at Sony for nearly 27 years before founding 2.0 Entertainment, a film and television production and co-financing company based at Sony. He is known for supervising films such as Men in Black and Bad Boys for Sony Pictures.

Early life
Belgrad was raised in Highland Park, Illinois. His father owned and operated a furniture manufacturing business founded by his grandfather. He graduated from the University of Pennsylvania in 1987 with a bachelor's degree in history.  He began his career at Kidder, Peabody as a securities analyst, specializing in media and entertainment companies, before joining Columbia Pictures in 1989.

Career

Sony Pictures
In 2008, he was named co-president of production at Sony Pictures Entertainment with Matt Tolmach. In 2010, Tolmach left Sony Pictures Entertainment and Belgrad was named as sole president of the studio. Belgrad worked on The Karate Kid (2010 film), which was the second co-production between a Hollywood studio and a Chinese studio, and the first shot entirely on the mainland. In June 2016, it was announced that Belgrad would be leaving Sony to move into a producing role.

2.0 Entertainment
Under the 2.0 Entertainment banner, Belgrad produces and co-finances a number of Sony movies, including the recent Peter Rabbit which has grossed over $300 million worldwide.

2.0 is building a television production arm, with projects including L.A.'s Finest, starring Jessica Alba and Gabrielle Union.

Filmography
Executive producer
 Peter Rabbit (2018)
 Zombieland: Double Tap (2019)
 L.A.'s Finest (2019-2020)
 Peter Rabbit 2: The Runaway (2021)

Producer
 Charlie's Angels (2019)
 Bad Boys for Life (2020)
 The Pope's Exorcist (2023)
 Gran Turismo (2023)

References

External links

Place of birth missing (living people)
Year of birth missing (living people)
Living people
American film producers
Presidents of Columbia Pictures